Crenicichla gaucho is a species of cichlid native to South America. It is found in the Uruguay River drainage, in the tributaries of the middle Uruguay River ie. Comandaí, Ijuí and Piratinim rivers.

The name comes from gaúcho, the local Brazilian name for a cowboy, referring to its distribution in the traditional south Brazilian cattle ranching districts.

References

gaucho
Taxa named by Carlos Alberto Santos de Lucena
Taxa named by Sven O. Kullander
Fish described in 1992